Megalorhipida angusta is a moth of the family Pterophoridae that is known from Yemen.

References

Oxyptilini
Moths described in 2002
Endemic fauna of Yemen
Moths of Asia
Invertebrates of the Arabian Peninsula